Deh-e Bad or Deh Bad may refer to:
 Deh-e Bad-e Olya
 Deh-e Bad-e Sofla